The Socialist Soviet Republic of Byelorussia or Soviet Socialist Republic of Belarus (SSRB;) was an early republic in the historical territory of Belarus after the collapse of the Russian Empire as a result of the October Revolution.

First establishment
Bolsheviks first established the Republic on 1 January 1919 in Smolensk when the Red Army entered Belarusian lands following the retreating German army, which had been occupying the territory as a consequence of World War I. The SSRB replaced the Belarusian People's Republic, and consisted of the governorates of Smolensk, Vitebsk, Mogilev, Minsk, Grodno, and Vilna.

It was considered by Bolsheviks to be a buffer republic. In a month it was disbanded. The Smolensk, Vitebsk and Mogilev provinces were included in the Russian Soviet Federative Socialist Republic (RSFSR), and the remainder formed another buffer republic, the Lithuanian–Belorussian Soviet Socialist Republic (Litbel).

Second establishment

The republic was re-established under the same name on 31 July 1920. However, in traditional Soviet historiography it has been referred to as the Byelorussian Soviet Socialist Republic (BSSR), its name after the incorporation into the Soviet Union in 1922.

External links
First establishment of SSRB
Second establishment of SSRB
The 1920 SSRB Constitution

 
Socialist Soviet Republic of Byelorussia
Byelorussia
Byelorussia
Byelorussia
Byelorussia
Byelorussia
Byelorussia